"Time" is a song by Japanese-American singer-songwriter Hikaru Utada, released on May 8, 2020, by Epic Records Japan. It served as the theme song for the NTV drama Bishoku Tantei Akechi Goro. The song was certified Gold by RIAJ for selling more than 100,000 digital downloads in Japan.

Charts

Weekly charts

References

2020 singles
Hikaru Utada songs
Songs written by Hikaru Utada
2020 songs